Podgorny is a rural locality (a selo) in Novgorodsky Selsoviet of Svobodnensky District, Amur Oblast, Russia. The population was 256 as of 2018. There are 3 streets.

Geography 
Podgorny is located 11 km south of Svobodny (the district's administrative centre) by road. Sovetsky is the nearest rural locality.

References 

Rural localities in Svobodnensky District